The naked sand darter (Ammocrypta beanii) is a species of freshwater ray-finned fish, a darter from the subfamily Etheostomatinae, part of the family Percidae, which also contains the perches, ruffes and pikeperches. It is found in the south-eastern United States.

Description
The naked sand darter is a small fish ranging in size from 40 to 50 mm long, the maximum being around 64 mm. Being a long thin darter, it is devoid of scales with the exception of a few rows above and below the lateral line and sometimes the caudal peduncle. Slightly transparent in life with a yellow color and iridescent operculum, the naked sand darter blends in with its habitat. It has darker bands in the dorsal, anal, and caudal fins with a whitish base and tip. Males of breeding size with have a dark spot at the front of the dorsal fin. Unlike similar darters, it does not have an opercular spine.

Diet
Larvae of small fish are the primary source of food for naked sand darters. They also feed on smaller crustaceans like copepods or clam larvae depending on their size. Naked sand darters feed continuously throughout the day, but stop at night. They also feed less in winter and summer months then pick back up before and after breeding season.

Habitat
Naked sand darters prefer the sandy bottoms of clean, freshwater rivers and streams. They can be found about 1 m deep on the bottom, digging into the sand to wait for prey to swim by.

Distribution
They can be found exclusively along the Gulf of Mexico in the rivers and drainages of eastern Louisiana to as far east as the Mobile Bay drainage in Alabama. Naked sand darters have been found as far north as West Tennessee.

Reproduction and lifecycle
Breeding season is from March or April until September or October when water temperatures are between 17 and 29 °C. Males develop tubercles on their anal and pelvic fins to aid in fighting for females. Females can produce from 12–122 eggs at a time and reach sexual maturity after a year. They only live 24 to 30 months.

Taxonomy and etymology
The naked sand darter was first formally described in 1877 by the American ichthyologist David Starr Jordan (1851-1931) with the type locality given as the Natalbany River, near Tickfaw, Louisiana.<ref name = CofF1>{{Cof record | spid = 20735 | title = Ammocrypta beanii | access-date = 19 September 2020}}</ref> It is the type species of the genus Ammocrypta, which Jordan also originally described. The genus name, Ammocrypta, comes from the Greek word ammos meaning sand and the Greek kryptos meaning hidden. The specific name, beanii'', comes from the first collector of the species, Tarleton H. Bean (1846-1915).

References

Percidae
Taxa named by David Starr Jordan
Fish described in 1877